WRXV in State College, Pennsylvania is a Christian contemporary music formatted radio station owned by Invisible Allies Ministries.  It serves the State College and Altoona markets.  It is branded as "Central PA's own Rev FM".  WRXV is the flagship station of the Pennsylvania Christian contemporary network RevFM.

Translators

External links
 Official website

Contemporary Christian radio stations in the United States
RXV
RXV